Purnia(also romanized as Purnea)  is the fourth largest city of Bihar and emerging as the biggest economic hub in North Bihar. It serves as the administrative headquarters of both Purnia district and Purnia division in the Indian state of Bihar. It is well known for its favourable climate like Darjeeling and have abundance amount of resources for human settlements and economic activities.

Population density of the city is 3058 persons per km sq. making it the 4th largest city of Bihar by population. It is nearly 315 km from Patna, as well as 171 km from Siliguri, 90 km from Bhagalpur. It is 640 km from Guwahati (Approx.) and 450 km from Kolkata, the capital of the adjacent state of West Bengal and the largest city in East India. Purnia district covers 3202.31 sq. km of the state of Bihar. The Indian Army, Indian Air Force, and three of five branches of India's Central Armed Police Forces – the Border Security Force (BSF), the Sashastra Seema Bal (SSB), and the Indo-Tibetan Border Police (ITBP) – have bases around the district.

Etymology
Several possible origins for the name Purnia have been proposed. The name may originate from the Sanskrit word Purna–Aranya, which means "complete jungle". Purnia could also be an altered form of the old name Purania, derived from the word purain or Lotus, which is said to have grown on the Kosi and Mahananda rivers.

The city's name is also romanized as Purnea.

History
Purnia is part of the Mithila region. Mithila first gained prominence after being settled by Indo-Aryan peoples who established the Mithila Kingdom (also called Kingdom of the Videhas). During the late Vedic period (c. 1100–500 BCE), Videha became one of the major political and cultural centers of South Asia, along with Kuru and Pañcāla. The kings of the Videha Kingdom were called Janakas. The Videha Kingdom was later incorporated into the Vajjika League, which had its capital in the city of Vaishali, which is also in Mithila.

In the 17th-century the rulers of Purnia were involved in wars with the Kings of Limbuwan.

At the beginning of British rule, many people from Europe came to Purnia and settled here. At that time, Purnia was a complete 'Purania', which means jungle. In the early days, Europeans settled around the Saura river in the middle of the city, which we now know as Rambagh area.

However, later all these Europeans started coming west from Saura river and started making their own 'Kothi'. The civil lines we see in different parts of the country were also in Purnia. The only difference was that in the civil lines of Lucknow, Kanpur etc., British officers used to stay, while Gentlemen Farmers in Purnia.

Among the most active European zamindars in Purnia were Alexander John Forbes and Palmer. Alexander John Forbes bought the Sultanpur pargana from Mahajan Babu Pratap Singh of Murshidabad in 1859 AD and became a Zamindar. Forbes city (Forbesganj) in the Sultanpur pargana was named after him. But Forbes lived in the city of Purnia. He was interested in building the race course and all other kinds of clubs.

Today, in the city where we see the Girl's high school, Forbes Kothi was used to be there. The Kothi used to be full with European settlers in the past.

Alexander Forbes and his wife Diana died of malaria in 1890. Time changed and the Forbes family sold the Sultanpur estate to the country's business house J. K. Singhania, because at that time there was a lot of jute cultivation going here.

Like Forbes, another Englishman lived in Purnia for a long time, his name was Palmer. He bought the zamindari of a king here and settled here. Palmer's only daughter, Mrs. Downing, was his heir. Mrs. Downing had two heirs - her son C. Y. Downing and daughter Mrs. Hays.

Today, the grand residence of Hez Saheb is the main building of Purnia College. There are different stories about Palmer, but other than those stories, this Englishman is still in the memories of Purnia.

Actually there is a dyke in the city which protects the city from floods. There is one area in the frontier of the city - Baghmara. From here, there is an embankment parallel to the Saura river, which was built by Palmer. This dam has been known as the Palmer Dam named after him.

Indigo cultivation was first started in Purnia by an Englishman named John Kelly. Later many Europeans cultivated indigo here vigorously. The Shillingford-dynasty was the foremost among them who built 'Nilha Kothi' in the places like Nilganj, Mahendrapur, Bhavbada. The story of Shillingford is also very interesting. He was a hunter. Still when we go from Purnea towards Dhamdaha and towards Sarsi area, we get to hear the story of Neelha farmer.

These English Gentleman Farmers have contributed most to the story of becoming Purnia from Poorania. These people did a lot of work regarding the city's settlement. Purnia was very open, green and open area.

Geography

Purnia and its surrounding lands lie in the sub-montane alluvial tract of the Gangetic Plain. The city however lies on the banks of numerous tributaries of the Koshi River. Two major rivers traverse Purnia city with the Kari Kosi river on the western end and the Saura river on the eastern end. The main city is situated between these two rivers.

Climate

Purnia is known for its favourable climate; it has earned the name "Mini Darjeeling" for this reason. Purnia has a largely humid climate, with the highest level of rainfall in Bihar state and humidity rising to above 70%. A cold season, from November to February, is followed by a hot season from March to June. The monsoon season begins in early June and lasts until September; 82% of its total annual rainfall falls during the monsoon season.

January, the coldest month, has a mean daily minimum temperature of 5 to 10 °C and a mean daily maximum of 20 to 25 °C. Wind is typically light in the non-monsoon seasons but during the monsoon, storms and depressions originating in the Bay of Bengal cause heavy rain and strong winds.

Demographics

As of the 2011 census, Purnia Municipal Corporation had a total population of 282,248, of which 148,077 were males and 134,171 were females. It had a sex ratio of 906 females to 1,000 males. The population below 6 years was 43,050. The literacy rate for the 6+ population was 73.02%, compared to the 74.04% national average. Purnia Urban Agglomeration, comprising Purnia Municipal Corporation and Kasba (Nagar Panchayat), had a population of 310,817 in 2011.

Languages
Maithili, is native language and Hindi, Urdu and Bengali are the other languages spoken by the people of Purnia. Surjapuri and Santali dialects are also spoken in some parts of the city. English continues to be taught in the English Medium schools.

Economy

In recent years, Purnia is growing as epic centre for service, automobile and many more economic sectors. This results as fast changing in lifestyle and economy of city.
Primarily, Gulabbagh, Khuskibagh, Line Bazar, Bhatta Bazar, Madhubani Bazar, City Industrial Estate and Maranga Outgrowth Centre are the prime location of economic activities.

Gulabbagh & Khuskibagh

Gulabbagh and Khuskibagh is situated at eastern outskirts of main city, and known for its famous agriculture market (in local language mandi). Many merchants come from Nepal and West Bengal to purchase supplies of raw material and specially Maize. GulabBagh in Purnia houses a major grain storehouse and is Asia's largest maize trading center. This location as well as central and eastern Bihar supply the grain requirements of Bengal, Nepal, and the states of Northeast India.

Agriculture

Purnia is supplied with agricultural products by its surrounding countryside. The alluvial soil, irrigated by the Kosi and Mahananda rivers, has been particularly suited to the paddy cultivation of rice. Other crops grown are potatoes, wheat, khesari, chickpeas, chili peppers, maize, lentils, arhar dal, barley, sugarcane, tobacco, makhana, mung beans, and jute. The previous extensive growing of jute supported a former flourishing jute industry which has now declined. The cultivation of maize has however soared in recent years in the city's outskirts.

Purnia is a powerful poultry producer and has also been catering to the demands of the nearby regions of Nepal and West Bengal for many years. Purnia is also well known for its fisheries. Fishes are also transported to the nearby markets of West Bengal, especially those in the Siliguri Metropolitan Region, the nearest large urban centre.

Education

Purnia has always been a centre of education in the north Bihar region. Zila School, founded in 1800 during the period of British rule, is Purnia's oldest school, and one of the city's largest. Jawahar Navodaya Vidyalaya, Garhbanaili (14 km away from main city) is a prestigious school run by the government. Vidya Vihar Residential School, the leading Boarding School of Bihar has its campus at Parora on Purnea. India's leading school chain G D Goenka Public School has its third campus of Bihar in Purnea after Patna and Gaya. Purnia also has a Kendriya Vidyalaya. Other prominent schools are -
 Vidya Vihar Residential School 
 Don Bosco public School
 S.R. DAV Public School 
 Ursuline Convent English/Hindi Medium School 
 Millia Convent English Medium School
 Purnia High School 
 Indian Public School 
 B.B.M. High School
 St. Peter Residential School
 Mount Zion Mission School
 Bright Career English School 
 Bijendra Public School 
 Saraswati Vidya Mandir 
 Saraswati Shishu Mandir
 St. John's High School
 Greenfield Public School

There are colleges for higher studies concentrating engineering, law, arts, and home science. Having recognition from the state government and various other government universities such as Aryabhatta Knowledge University, Bihar Agriculture University and Purnea University, these colleges include:
 Purnia College
 B.M.T. Law College
 Vidya Vihar Institute of Technology
 Millia Group of Colleges (managed by Millia Education Trust)
 Bhola Paswan Shastri Agriculture College
 Purnia Mahila College
 Millia Institute of Technology
 Millia Polytechnic Rambagh
 Government Polytechnic of Purnea
 Purnia College of Engineering
 Simanchal Institute of Medical Science, Kasba (OPD functional from Jan 2018)
 Government Medical College and Hospital, Sadar Hospital Purnea
 Shershah Institute of Medical Sciences
 Medical College and Hospital by Millia Educational Trust

3D animation and multimedia institute:

 Animation School (Madhubani Bazar)

The Indian Red Cross Society has the largest blood bank in the state after Patna, with a capacity of 1,000 units. The Bihar government recently inaugurated one of the three megastock warehouses for drugs/medicines at Kasba, which aims to serve the 13 districts of North Bihar.

The Indira Gandhi Stadium houses the Sports Authority of India sports hostel for athletes. The DSA and Zila School grounds are the city's outdoor stadiums.

The region has been blessed with Purnea University (9th University of Bihar). The university is the only in Purnea Commissionerate. It includes colleges of Purnea, Katihar, Araria and Kishanganj.

Transportation

Air

Purnea Airport, also known as Chunapur Airport (Airforce Station), is located within the cantonment area but is restricted to army usage only. Proposals for the airport to operate scheduled flights are being widely discussed at the level of the state government.

The nearest commercial airport, Bagdogra Airport, is about 150 km away at Bagdogra in Darjeeling district. Jay Prakash Narayan International Airport (Patna Airport) is located in Patna, capital of Bihar, at a distance of 310 km from Purnia.

Rail

Purnia Junction is closer to the residents of Khuskibagh, Gulabbagh, and Eastern Purnia, while Purnia Court is in the western part of the city and caters to the residents of Madhubani, Janta Chowk, and Central and Western Purnia.

Road

The newly constructed  directly connects Purnia to some important towns and cities of North Bihar namely Darbhanga & Muzaffarpur. It takes nearly 5 hours to reach Muzaffarpur through this Expressway. This expressway which also traverses through the newly built Kosi Mahasetu bridge ends at Muzaffarpur to continue further for Patna. It has turned out to be an alternate route for Patna & has helped in decongesting the ever busy and traffic-prone NH31.

It is a modern four-lane highway constructed by National Highways Authority of India (NHAI). State Highways 60, 62, 65, 77 & 90 also pass through Purnia.

Notable Events
Phanishwar Nath Renu's popular story "Maare Gaye Gulfam" which was adapted into a film Teesri Kasam (The Third Vow), by Basu Bhattacharya (produced by the poet-lyricist Shailendra) in 1966 was shot in Purnia, in which old Purnea is pictured, especially 'the Gulabbag Mela'.

Purnia held the record for making and displaying the world's longest tricolour flag, with the length measured at 7,100 metres (7.1 km) before it was broken on 12 August 2019 by Raipur, Chattisgadh.

Notable people

 Raja Bahadur Kirtyanand Sinha (1880-1938), patron and known for charitable works
Syed Abdus Samad (footballer) (1895-1964), footballer
 Satinath Bhaduri (1906–1965), novelist and politician
 Phanishwar Nath 'Renu' (1921–1977), novelist
 Balai Chand Mukhopadhyay (1899–1979), playwright and poet
 Bhola Paswan Shastri, three-time Chief Minister of Bihar
 Alo Roy, noted Bengali poet, story writer and cultural organiser.
 Sushant Singh Rajput, actor
 Gurmeet Choudhary, actor
 Ajit Sarkar, politician
 Sweta Singh, News Editor
 Manish Vatsalya, Film Director

See also
 Chunapur

References

Further reading
 Chakrabarti D.K. (1996b). From Purnea to Champaran: The distribution of sites in the north Bihar plains. South Asian Studies, 12: pp. 147–158

 
Cities and towns in Purnia district